Vaterpolski klub Jadran Split, commonly referred to as Jadran Split or simply Jadran, is a professional water polo club based in Split, Croatia. As of 2021–22 season, the club competes in the Croatian League, Regional League A1 and LEN Champions League.

History
Jadran was founded in 1920 originally called "Pomorski klub Baluni" which changed to "Jadran Split" almost the year after the winning of the first national championship in 1923. Immediately after the Second World War (1946-60) the club topped the league six times, two of these (1947, 1948) as the water polo section of the famous multi-sports club of Hajduk Split. Thirty years later Jadran returned powerfully to the forefront in 1991 by winning the last league of united Yugoslavia, followed by two consecutive conquests of the European Championship in 1992 and 1993 as a representative value of the newly independent Croatia. The 1997-98 season found Jadran in another one European cup final but this time lost the LEN Trophy from Partizan.

Honours

European competitions
LEN Champions League
 Winners (2): 1991-92, 1992-93
LEN Trophy
 Runners-up (1): 1997-98
LEN Super Cup
 Runners-up (2): 1992, 1993
COMEN Cup
 Winners (2): 1991, 1995
Regional League
 Runners-up (1): 2021-22

Domestic competitions
Yugoslav League
 Winners (9): 1923, 1939, 1946, 1947, 1948, 1953, 1957, 1960, 1990-91
Croatian Cup
Winners (1): 2021-22

Current squad
Season 2021–22

References

External links
 

Water polo clubs in Croatia
Sport in Split, Croatia
Sports clubs established in 1920